Aleksy Sobaszek (1895–1942) was a Polish Roman Catholic priest. He died in a Nazi concentration camp. He is one of the 108 Martyrs of World War II who were beatified by Pope John Paul II in 1999.

References

1895 births
1942 deaths
20th-century Polish Roman Catholic priests
Clergy from Poznań
People from Gniezno
Polish people who died in Nazi concentration camps
108 Blessed Polish Martyrs